R. Ramachandran is an Indian politician in the Communist Party of India. He served as the former member of Kerala Legislative Assembly from the Karunagappally.

References 

Communist Party of India politicians from Kerala
Kerala MLAs 2016–2021
1952 births
Living people